Ritsa Football Club is a football club in the city of Gudauta, in the state of Abkhazia that competes in the Abkhazian Premier League.

History
Founded on 1994 in the city of Gudauta in the state of Abkhazia, the club is affiliated with the Football Federation of Abkhazia.

Titles
  Abkhazian Premier League (2)  
 Abkhazian Cup (1)

References 

Association football clubs established in 1994